Zegarra is a surname. Notable people with the surname include:

Nicolás Fuentes (1941-2015), full name Domingo Nicolás Fuentes Zegarra, Peruvian footballer
Dina Ercilia Boluarte Zegarra (born 1962), the 64th president of Peru 
Carlos Zegarra (footballer) (born 1977), Peruvian footballer
Pablo Zegarra (born 1973), Peruvian footballer and manager
Rosana Zegarra, American rower
Willy Zegarra (1908–2005), Chilean actor